The County of Nassau was a German state within the Holy Roman Empire and later part of the German Confederation. Its ruling dynasty, the male line of which is now extinct, was the House of Nassau.

Origins
Nassau, originally a county, developed on the lower Lahn river in what is known today as Rhineland-Palatinate. The town of Nassau was founded in 915. Dudo of Laurenburg held Nassau as a fiefdom as granted by the Bishopric of Worms.  His son, Rupert, built the Nassau Castle there around 1125, declaring himself "Count of Nassau". This title was not officially acknowledged by the Bishop of Worms until 1159 under the rule of Rupert's son, Walram. By 1159, the County of Nassau effectively claimed rights of taxation, toll collection, and justice, at which point it can be considered to become a state.

The Nassauers held the territory between the Taunus and the Westerwald at the lower and middle Lahn. By 1128, they acquired the bailiwick of the Bishopric of Worms, which had numerous rights in the area, and thus created a link between their heritage at the lower Lahn and their possessions near Siegen. In the middle of the 12th century, this relationship was strengthened by the acquisition of parts of the Hesse-Thüringen feudal kingdom, namely the Herborner Mark, the Kalenberger Zent and the Court of Heimau (Löhnberg). Closely linked to this was the "Lordship of Westerwald", also in Nassau's possession at the time. At the end of the 12th century, the House acquired the Reichshof Wiesbaden, an important base in the southwest.

In 1255, after the Counts of Nassau acquired the estates of Weilburg, the sons of Count Henry II divided Nassau for the first time.  Walram II received the county of Nassau-Weilburg.  From 1328 on, his younger brother, Otto I, held the estates north of the Lahn river, namely the County of Nassau-Siegen and Nassau-Dillenburg.  The boundary line was essentially the Lahn, with Otto receiving the northern part of the county with the cities of Siegen, Dillenburg, Herborn and Haiger and Walram retaining the section south of the river, including the cities of Weilburg and Idstein.

County of Nassau-Weilburg
Walram's son Adolf became King of Germany in 1292. His son Count Gerlach abdicated in 1344 and the County was divided under his sons in 1355
County of Nassau-Weilburg, again divided from 1442 to 1574
County of Nassau-Saarbrücken (Elder)
County of Nassau-Weilburg
County of Nassau-Wiesbaden, again divided from 1480 to 1509
County of Nassau-Idstein
County of Nassau-Wiesbaden
fell back to Nassau-Weilburg in 1605
County of Nassau-Sonnenberg, partitioned among Nassau-Wiesbaden and Nassau-Weilburg in 1405
In 1605, all parts of Nassau-Weilburg were again unified under Count Louis II;  however, after his death in 1627, his sons divided the county again
County of Nassau-Idstein, fell to Nassau-Ottweiler in 1721
County of Nassau-Saarbrücken (Younger), divided again in 1640
County of Nassau-Saarbrücken, fell to Nassau-Ottweiler in 1723
County of Nassau-Ottweiler, fell to Nassau-Usingen in 1728
County of Nassau-Usingen, Principality in 1688
County of Nassau-Weilburg (Younger)
After Nassau-Usingen had inherited Nassau-Ottweiler with former Nassau-Idstein and Nassau-Saarbrücken, it was reunified with Nassau-Weilburg and raised to the Duchy of Nassau in 1806.

County of Nassau-Dillenburg
After the death of Count Otto I, his county was divided between his sons in 1303:
County of Nassau-Dillenburg, fell to Nassau-Siegen in 1328
County of Nassau-Hadamar (Elder), fell to Nassau-Dillenburg in 1394
County of Nassau-Siegen, called Nassau-Dillenburg from 1328 on, again got divided from 1341 to 1561:
County of Nassau-Beilstein (Elder)
County of Nassau-Dillenburg (Elder)–1606)

In 1504, Henry III of Nassau-Dillenburg inherited the County's estates at Breda in the Duchy of Brabant, while his younger brother William became Count of Nassau-Dillenburg in 1516. After the son of Henry III, René of Châlon died in 1544, Count William's eldest son William the Silent became Prince of Orange and Lord of Breda, Stadtholder in the Low Countries from 1559 on. His younger brother, John VI, again reunited all Nassau-Dillenburg possessions in 1561, though the County was again divided after his death in 1606.

County of Nassau-Hadamar (Younger), Principality in 1650, fell to Nassau-Diez in 1743
County of Nassau-Siegen, (1607–23), again got divided from 1623 to 1734:
 County of Nassau-Siegen (Protestant), Principality in 1664, became extinct in 1734
 County of Nassau-Siegen (Catholic), Principality, fell to Nassau-Diez in 1743
County of Nassau-Dillenburg, fell to Nassau-Beilstein in 1620
County of Nassau-Beilstein (Younger), called Nassau-Dillenburg (Younger) from 1620 on, Principality in 1652, fell to Nassau-Dietz in 1739
County of Nassau-Dietz, fell to Joachim Murat's Grand Duchy of Berg after the dissolution of the Holy Roman Empire in 1806

The Counts of Nassau-Dietz, descendants of William Frederick were stadtholders of Friesland, Groningen and Drenthe and Princes of Orange from 1702 on. When they lost their Dutch possessions during the Napoleonic Wars, they were compensated with the Principality of Nassau-Orange-Fulda.  Though they lost their German possessions in 1806, the House of Orange-Nassau, through female succession, was the reigning house of the Grand Duchy of Luxembourg until 1890 and is still the royal house of the Netherlands.

Rulers

House of Nassau

Partitions of Nassau under House of Nassau rule

Table of rulers

Nassau's successor states

Kings and Queens of the Netherlands (from the House of Orange-Nassau-Dietz)

1815–1840: William I, also Duke and Grand Duke of Luxemburg and Duke of Limburg
1840–1849: William II, also Grand Duke of Luxemburg and Duke of Limburg
1849–1890: William III, also Grand Duke of Luxemburg and Duke of Limburg
1890–1948: Wilhelmina
Following defunct German laws that no longer have relevance due to the end of German nobility, the House of Orange-Nassau(-Dietz) has been extinct since the death of Wilhelmina (1962). Dutch laws and the Dutch nation do not consider it extinct.
1948–1980: Juliana
1980–2013: Beatrix
2013-present: Willem-Alexander

Grand Dukes of Luxembourg (from the House of Nassau-Weilburg)

1890–1905: Adolphe
1905–1912: William IV
1912–1919: Marie-Adélaïde, succession through a female onwards
1919–1964: Charlotte
1964–2000: Jean
2000–present: Henri

See also
 House of Nassau
 County of Nassau-Saarbrücken
 Duchy of Nassau

References

States of the Confederation of the Rhine
States of the German Confederation
Nassau (state)
Former states and territories of Rhineland-Palatinate
Counties of the Holy Roman Empire